Behavioural Processes is a monthly peer-reviewed scientific journal publishing original research papers in the field of ethology. It was established in 1976 and is published by Elsevier. The editors-in-chief are Johan J. Bolhuis (Utrecht University) and Olga Lazareva (Drake University). According to the Journal Citation Reports, the journal has a 2017 impact factor of 1.555.

References

External links

English-language journals
Publications established in 1976
Monthly journals
Ethology journals
Elsevier academic journals